StudentAdvisor is a US-based college discovery site owned by The Washington Post Company. On this site students can research colleges with free match and compare tools and browse college reviews written by students and alumni. Registered users have the ability to submit college reviews, ask and answer questions pertaining to college, and connect with a social network of Verified Advisors.  StudentAdvisor also publishes college planning guides on a variety of topics including financial aid, admissions, internships, and more. The site is the home of The Top 100 Social Media Colleges, a scientifically calculated list that highlights US colleges best using social media. StudentAdvisor is a member of the National Association for College Admission Counseling (NACAC) and is headquartered in Cambridge, Massachusetts.

History
StudentAdvisor along with CourseAdvisor.com, was founded in 2004 by a group of entrepreneurs and alumni from MIT and the University of Massachusetts/Amherst. In 2007, CourseAdvisor and StudentAdvisor were acquired by the Washington Post Company, becoming a wholly owned subsidiary of the Company. In 2009, Avenue100 Media Solutions was formed to serve as a holding company for the numerous sites that the team manages.  Avenue100 is headquartered just outside Boston in Woburn, Massachusetts.

September 2010 StudentAdvisor was relaunched in partnership with Newsweek Education, the education vertical published by Newsweek Magazine.  The joint venture was designed to present students and parents with the best available options for higher education.  At that time Newsweek was also a Washington Post Company, however in November 2010 Newsweek merged with the news and opinion website The Daily Beast and is no longer affiliated with StudentAdvisor.

In August 2011 StudentAdvisor moved to their new headquarters in Cambridge, Massachusetts.

July 2011, The Washington Post Company sold its interest in digital marketing company Avenue100 Media Solutions to a management group but retained ownership of StudentAdvisor.com 

As of 2019, the StudentAdvisor.com website redirects to Purdue University Global.

Top 100 Social Media Colleges

In March 2011, StudentAdvisor released its "Top 100 Social Media Colleges©."  These rankings, are the only scientifically calculated list highlighting colleges who demonstrate the best uses of social media across the U.S.   According to Dean Tsouvalas, Editor-in-Chief of StudentAdvisor and Katherine Godfrey, Ph. D, Chief Science Officer for Avenue100 Media, they started with a comprehensive list of more than six thousand colleges for which they had compiled information for the StudentAdvisor site. Next, they researched Facebook fan pages, Twitter accounts and other social media sites associated with each of those schools. The team then restricted the rankings to include only those schools that met the following criteria:
 Facebook pages that had at least 500 fans
 Each college had to have at least one such Facebook fan page and at least one Twitter account in order to be included in the rankings
 They removed colleges where they could not verify the total enrollment information
To arrive at the final list, the data included total Facebook fan counts, total number and effectiveness of Twitter followers among other factors. During the course of the list compilation, the team is regularly
re-measuring and updating the data by regularly revisiting the various Facebook, Twitter, and other social media pages.

In October 2011, this project was named a finalist in the Massachusetts Innovation and Technology Exchange’s (MITX) 16th Annual Interactive Awards.

Scholarships
In April 2011 StudentAdvisor launched a $24,000 scholarship contest in which they awarded 24 $1,000 scholarships in 24 hours to college students for reviewing their schools on the site.

Scholarship season 2012 saw the development and launch of the award winning ScholarshipAdvisor search app on iTunes.

ScholarshipAdvisor – a web and mobile application to search, bookmark and share thousands of scholarship listings, helping students save money on their education

References

External links
Official
StudentAdvisor Website

Student organizations in the United States